The  Street Fighter (Japanese: ザ • ストリート • ファイター, Hepburn: Za Sutorīto Faitā) is a 1974 Japanese martial arts film produced by Toei Company Ltd., originally released in Japan as . It was released in the US by New Line Cinema and became one of the first films to be a commercial success for the distributor. It is notable as the first film to receive an X-rating in the United States solely for violence. In the UK it was originally released as Kung Fu Streetfighter (カンフー・ストリートファイター, Kanfū Sutorītofaitā), presumably to avoid confusion with the Charles Bronson film Hard Times which was initially released as The Streetfighter in the UK.

The Street Fighter inspired two sequels, Return of the Street Fighter and The Street Fighter's Last Revenge. Additionally, the film Sister Street Fighter and its sequels is a spin-off series of The Street Fighter. There was another spin-off entitled Kozure Satsujin Ken, which was brought to the US by a different company under the title Karate Warriors. None of the spin-offs have any of the same characters from The Street Fighter films.

Plot
The film begins as Takuma Tsurugi (renamed Terry Sugury in the English dub) meets the condemned murderer Tateki Shikenbaru (renamed Junjo in the English dub) while disguised as a Buddhist monk. Tsurugi applies his "oxygen coma punch" to Shikenbaru, causing him to collapse just before he can be executed. As Shikenbaru is rushed to a hospital, Tsurugi and his sidekick Rakuda (renamed Ratnose in the English dub) ambush the ambulance and free him. As Tsurugi and Rakuda watch the incident on the news, Shikenbaru's brother Gijun and sister Nachi arrive and plead for more time to pay for Tsurugi's help. Outraged, Tsurugi refuses and attacks the siblings. Gijun accidentally kills himself when Tsurugi dodges his flying kick, causing him to go out of a window, and Nachi is sold into sexual slavery through Renzo Mutaguchi.

Mutaguchi and his associates attempt to hire Tsurugi to kidnap Sarai, the daughter of a recently deceased oil tycoon. Tsurugi refuses after discovering that the gangsters are Yakuza. He escapes, but the Yakuza gangsters resolve to kill Tsurugi as well as kidnap Sarai. Tsurugi immediately seeks out Sarai, who is being protected at the Nippon Seibukan dojo by her uncle, Kendō Masaoka, a Karate master. Tsurugi captures Sarai and challenges the entire dojo to a fight. He brutalizes the rank-and-file students before Masaoka fights him to a standstill, then recognizes him as the half-Chinese son of a karate master he knew long ago. Ultimately, Tsurugi offers to protect Sarai, and Masaoka agrees, against Sarai's protests. Meanwhile, the Yakuza's allies in Hong Kong, led by Kowloon boss Dinsau, recruit Shikenbaru to avenge his siblings by killing Tsurugi.

The gangsters make several attempts to kill Tsurugi before they successfully kidnap Sarai. Tsurugi manages to rescue her, but gets captured himself. Rakuda gives up Sarai's location to save Tsurugi, causing Tsurugi to forsake him. When Tsurugi struggles fighting with a blind samurai working for the Hong Kong gangsters, Rakuda dies by his sword in a reckless attempt at redemption. Tsurugi finally tracks the gangsters down to a shipyard and fights his way through their guards. In the end, Dinsau permits Tsurugi to duel Shikenbaru. Nachi sacrifices herself to give her brother a free shot with a sai, but Tsurugi survives and rips out Shikenbaru's vocal cords. Critically wounded, Tsurugi is helped to his feet by Sarai and Dinsau in the final shot of the film.

Cast
Note: English-translated names, if given or known, will be in parentheses:
 Shinichi "Sonny" Chiba as Takuma (Terry) Tsurugi
 Yutaka "Doris" Nakajima as Sarai Chuayut-Hammett
 Goichi "Gerald" Yamada as Rakuda (Ratnose) Zhang
 Masashi "Milton" Ishibashi as Tateki (Junjo) Shikenbaru
 Jirō Chiba as Gijun Shikenbaru
 Etsuko "Sue" Shihomi as Nachi Shikenbaru
 Masafumi Suzuki as Kendō Masaoka
 Nobuo Kawai as Tetsunosuke Tsuchida
 Ken Kazama as Senkaku Kan
 Yūshiro Sumi as Onaga
 Rinichi Yamamoto as Kowloon Dingsau
 Fumio Watanabe as Renzō Mutaguchi
 Osman Yusuf as Kingstone
 Tatsuo Endō as Bayan
 Chico Lourant as Bondo
 Tony Cetera as Abdul Jadot

US releases
The Street Fighter was the first film to receive an X rating solely for intense violence and mild gore. The film was especially controversial because of a scene in which Tsurugi castrates the rapist Bondo with his bare hands; it is this scene (among others) that reputedly gained the film its 'X' rating. A similarly violent scene involves Tsurugi delivering a powerful punch to an henchman's head, followed by a one-second cut to an x-ray shot of the skull being completely shattered and blood gushing from the man's entire face. 16 minutes were later edited from the film in order to get an R-rating. This was the version initially released on home video by MGM/CBS Home Video in 1980. Since then, the film was re-released in its entirety. Consequently, the English dub of the uncut version suffers from inconsistencies to the soundtrack quality, as the restored footage was dubbed by a different studio using different voice actors.

In the English dubbed versions of The Street Fighter and Return of The Street Fighter, Chiba's character is identified as "Terry Sugury" in the credits but dubbed by the voice actors as "Terry Tsurugi". In The Street Fighter's Last Revenge, however, the voice actors call him "Terry Sugury". Rakuda is named "Ratnose", while the villain Tateki'''s name is also mistranslated as Junjō.

Shout! Factory acquired the license of all three films in the series for a Blu-ray release on February 19, 2019 via their Shout! Selects line. It contains the dub, and original Japanese audio. For the first time, the uncut original English version was made available, but without the newer audio recordings.

Legacy and influence
The title of the arcade fighting game Street Fighter (1987) was inspired by The Street Fighter.The Street Fighter introduced x-ray vision fatality finishing moves. It was initially seen as a gimmick to distinguish it from other martial arts films, before it went on to influence later works, including the Mortal Kombat series of fighting games.

The 1991 Hong Kong film Riki-Oh: The Story of Ricky includes a scene where protagonist Ricky Ho Lik-wong delivers an X-ray punch to an attacker.

In 1993, the film (and its sequels) received mainstream exposure in North America when they were featured in Tony Scott's True Romance (written by Quentin Tarantino), which had the two lead characters spending time at a Sonny Chiba Street Fighter marathon.

Quentin Tarantino listed The Street Fighter as number 13 on his top 20 grindhouse films list.

The 2007 video game The Darkness'' has the entire film available to watch on any of the in-game TVs.

References

External links
 
 
 

1974 films
1970s action films
Films set in China
Films set in Hong Kong
Films set in Japan
Films set in Kobe
Films set in Tokyo
Japanese action films
1970s Japanese-language films
Karate films
The Street Fighter
Kung fu films
Japanese vigilante films
Yakuza films
Japanese martial arts films
Films directed by Shigehiro Ozawa
1970s Japanese films